Goran Menkov (born 5 December 1987 in Skopje, SR Macedonia, SFR Yugoslavia) is a Macedonian visual artist. He holds a degree in painting at Ss. Cyril and Methodius University of Skopje, Faculty of Fine Arts, in the class of Professor Rubens Korubin.

Most notably he has exhibited works in the ninth and tenth  Biennale of Young Artists at the Contemporary Art Museum of Macedonia, at the 2014 DLUM Winter Salon, and was awarded the 2013 DLUM Experimental Drawing Award.
Menkov for the first time in the global visual art scene, used mold (fungus) as a painting technique to produce original contemporary artworks, he exhibited his experimental mold paintings at his solo exhibition Stale Art, Hibernation in November 2013 in Skopje, Macedonia.

In 2013 Menkov represented the Republic of Macedonia in the 7th Francophone Games which were held in Nice, France, from September 6–15. He was a member of the official Macedonian Delegation (Visual Arts, Painting) and took part in the Cultural events at the 2013 Jeux de la Francophonie.

In May 2014 as a recognition for the 2013 Experimental Drawing Award, 
DLUM organized the Experimental Drawing-Line, Third Dimension exhibition  for the recipient of the award Goran Menkov, at the DLUM gallery space, Skopje, Macedonia.

Also in 2014 Menkov was nominated for the prestigious DENES Young Visual Artist Annual Award,  an annual award for best young artist in the Republic of Macedonia under 35, organised by The Contemporary Art Center – Skopje, in collaboration with the Civil Society Foundation in New York.
Took part in the first edition of Paratissima Skopje, and was one of the few artist selected to exhibit in the Tenth international  Paratissima Turin, the  most visited contemporary art event in Italy. Exhibited at the prestigious Osten Biennial of Drawing, 42nd World Gallery of Drawing – Skopje 2014 and received the Special Award by the Jury(Nickolas Thaw, USA – President, Anita Haldemann, Switzerland – Member, Pavle Pejovic, Montenegro – Member)

References

External links
 Goran Menkof at behance.net

1987 births
Living people
Ss. Cyril and Methodius University of Skopje alumni
Macedonian painters
Macedonian culture
Macedonian art
Macedonian contemporary artists